Gambia: Take Me to Learn My Roots, is a 2019 British–Gambian documentary film directed by Bacary Bax and produced by Bud Sugar. The film deals with mission of a single mother to teach her mixed-race sons about their West African roots.

The film was shot in both England (Kingston upon Hull, East Riding of Yorkshire) and The Gambian (Brikama) locations. The film received positive reviews from critics.

Cast
 Bacary Bax
 Stan Hill	
 Lans Lister	
 Rob Mills
 Wes Eluda	
 Luncher Jatta	
 Jatta Kunda	
 Susan Lister

References

External links
 
 Gambia: Take Me To Learn My Roots on YouTube

2019 films
2019 documentary films
Gambian documentary films
British documentary films
2010s English-language films
2010s British films